The Road Emergency Services Communications Unit (RESCU) is a traffic management system used by the City of Toronto on city managed highways. The system is used to monitor traffic on:

 Gardiner Expressway from the Queen Elizabeth Way to the Don Valley Parkway - 28 cameras
 Don Valley Parkway from the Gardiner Expressway to Ontario Highway 401 - 17 cameras
 Lake Shore Boulevard from near Parkside Drive to Leslie Street - 17 cameras
 Allen Road from Finch Avenue West to Eglinton Avenue - 9 cameras

Various intersections through the GTA are also monitored including Woodbine Avenue and Steeles Avenue / Ontario Highway 404, Black Creek Drive and Lawrence Avenue West, Don Mills Road and Overlea Boulevard, and Warden Avenue and Ellesmere Road.

The  system consists of:

 70+ traffic cameras
 635 vehicle sensors
 5 overhead changeable message signs - Gardiner Expressway and Don Valley Parkway
 4 portable signs
 121 detector stations (650 loops)
 Remote Traffic Information System (RTIS) - website
 Queue End Warning System - reminder for drivers that Allen Road ends at Eglinton Avenue West by using flashing light/sign and display screen on southbound Allen Road at Glengrove Avenue and south of Viewmount Avenue; advisory overhead sign at Flemingdon Road.

See also

RESCU is linked to the Ontario Ministry of Transportation's Freeway Traffic Management System or COMPASS.

References

 RESCU

Transport in the Greater Toronto Area
Transport in Ontario
Intelligent transportation systems